Dashen Beer Football Club (Amharic: ዳሽን ቢራ) was a professional Ethiopian football club based in Gondar. They were a member of the Ethiopian Football Federation until the club was dissolved in 2016.

History 
The club was founded and run by Dashen Brewery. The club played in the Ethiopian Premier League until being relegated after the 2015-16 season. The club folded after its relegation from the top division.

Stadium 
Their home stadium Was Gondar Stadium.

Former Players 

Dereje Alemu
Aynalem Hailu
 Asrat Megersa
 Yonathan Kebede
 Ephrem Wondwesen
 Tewdros Gitsadik
 Suleman Ahmed
 Muluneh Getahun
 Mesfin Wendemu
 Yared Zewdeneh
 Faysei Mohammed
 Jilalo Shafi
 Dereje Hailu
 Yetesha Gizaw
 Ermias Hailu
 Adamu Numoro
 Tewderos Getenet
 Haileeyesus Berehanu
 Wekil Redi
 Webeshet Kasaye
 Ashenafi Yetayew
 Menyahel Yimer

References

External links
Current squad
Soccerway

Football clubs in Ethiopia
Sport in Amhara Region
Gondar